Julie Ann Emery (born January 16, 1975) is an American television and film actress. She is best known for her roles in the television series Better Call Saul, Preacher, and Five Days at Memorial. She has appeared in films such as Hitch and Gifted.

Early life
Emery was born and raised in Crossville, Tennessee, the daughter of computer analyst Janice (née Fields) and dairy farmer Gary Emery. She graduated from Cumberland County High School in 1990 in Crossville then studied acting at the Webster Conservatory at Webster University in St. Louis, Missouri.

Career
Emery began her career at the age of 16 and has appeared in several stage productions, such as A Funny Thing Happened on the Way to the Forum and Bye Bye Birdie. She has appeared in films and television series such as ER, CSI: Miami, Taken, Commander in Chief, Line of Fire, Hitch, and Fargo. She played recurring character Betsy Kettleman in the first and sixth seasons of Breaking Bad spin-off Better Call Saul. She reprised the role in a short film titled "No Picnic".

In 2017, Emery joined the main cast for the second season of the television series Preacher, in the role of Sarah Featherstone.

Personal life
Emery is married to actor Kevin Earley; they met while attending Webster Conservatory. They live in Los Angeles, California. Emery enjoys hydroponics.

Filmography

Film

Television

References

External links
 
 Official website 

1975 births
American stage actresses
American television actresses
American film actresses
Living people
People from Crossville, Tennessee
Actresses from Tennessee
21st-century American actresses
Webster University alumni